The TC1000 is a 10.4" laplet designed by Compaq, before it was purchased by HP. It used the Transmeta Crusoe processor.  Unlike many other tablet PCs of its time (which can only operate either in a traditional laptop configuration, or with the keyboard folded behind the screen), the display is fully detachable from the keyboard. The product was developed and manufactured using ODM model from LG Electronics, Inc. of South Korea.

The TC1000 was replaced by the HP Compaq TC1100 which features a faster Pentium M processor and an integrated digitizer from Wacom (the TC1000 used a Finepoint digitizer which required a AAAA battery and lacked pressure-input, being binary on/off only), among other small upgrades.

The TC1000 comes with Windows XP Tablet PC Edition  but it is capable of running Linux.

A restore CD is available on the Internet Archive  to restore the machine to its factory configuration.

Design Awards
The TC1000 has won numerous industrial design awards. These include:
2003 IDEA Bronze Award
2003 IF Product Design Award
2003 ID Magazine Honorable Mention  (http://www.idonline.com/)
2003 Good Design Award

Reviews
C/Net Review is mixed.

References

tc1000